Pitto may refer to:

 Pitto (Game), a game also referred to as 'Seven Tiles'
 Alfredo Pitto, Italian footballer